Star One Horror Nights is an Indian horror drama television series that aired on Star One. It used to air at 9.30 p.m. every Saturday and Sunday on Star One.

Cast
 Rashmi Singh
 Sreejita De
 Mamik Singh
 Chandana Sharma
 Ridhi Dogra
  Ali Hassan 
 Himanshu Malhotra

References

Star One (Indian TV channel) original programming